Eucalyptus fitzgeraldii, commonly known as the broad-leaved box or the paper-barked box, is a tree that is endemic to Western Australia. It has rough, flaky bark, flower buds arranged in groups of seven and bell-shaped to urn-shaped fruit.

Description
Flowering occurs between August and September and the flowers are whitish cream.

Taxonomy
Eucalyptus fitzgeraldii was first formally described in 1934 by William Blakely from a specimen collected between Tabletop Mountain and the Artesian Range near the Charnley River by William Vincent Fitzgerald. The specific epithet (fitzgeraldii) honours the collector of the type specimen.

Distribution
The broad-leaved box is found on rocky hillsides and plains in the northern Kimberley region of Western Australia where it grows in clay soils around basalt or dolerite.

Conservation status
This eucalypt is classified as "Priority Two" by the Western Australian Government Department of Parks and Wildlife meaning that it is poorly known and from only one or a few locations.

See also
List of Eucalyptus species

References

Eucalypts of Western Australia
Trees of Australia
fitzgeraldii
Myrtales of Australia
Plants described in 1934
Taxa named by William Blakely